Alan Dennis Clark is a British physicist and member of the American Physical Society. He was born in London in 1945.

Career
After attending school at St Benedict's School in Ealing he studied at the City University London where he received his Bachelor of Science in Applied Physics in 1968 and at the Imperial College London where he received his Master of Science in Applied Optics, as well as the Diploma of the Imperial College, in 1969. Alan has lived in Germany since the 1980s.

After his university education, Alan Dennis Clark worked in the field of industrial optics initially as a designer, later as Marketing Director and MD of J.H. Dallmeyer Ltd., London (founded by John Henry Dallmeyer in 1860, later continued by Thomas Rudolphus Dallmeyer). He later founded his own company MSE GmbH in Bonn, Germany working as an optical designer and marketing consultant offering a range of services to various high tech companies. From 1992-2016: Co-founder & MD of Clark & Fischer-Clark GmbH, Neunkirchen, Germany.

For over 35 years he has been extensively involved with the design-, marketing- and sales-activities of high technology companies requiring a clear understanding of the associated technologies and physics involved. The work requires the specification, design and supply of critical optical modules as essential components of high technology complex systems. As an optical design consultant he is designing lenses for industrial and commercial applications.

His interests cover a broad range of topics in physics and especially the bigger questions of physics and the universe still to be answered. Based on the work of the theoretical physicists of the early twentieth century, his in depth review of the fundamentals of physics resulted in the writing of the book "Physics in 5 Dimensions". The research work spanning many years was completed in tandem with earning a living from high technology industrial projects involving applied physics. The challenge arising from these parallel activities was the limit on time and resources for research and writing, while the major advantage was working on new perspectives of physics alongside "real time" applied physics for industrial projects. This ongoing interaction with industrial projects provided a broad based and very valuable experience of theoretical and practical physics.

The book "Physics in 5 Dimensions" describes in detail an objective view of physics. The current perspective of classical physics is summarised for each field of physics covered, using carefully edited material from identified sources. With this backdrop of classical physics, the theory of "Physics in 5 Dimensions" is presented in a clear manner with mathematical expressions to support the theory. These expressions are common and coherent across the various fields of physics covered and many "figures" illustrate the key relationships between parameters. Compared to classical physics, "Physics in 5 Dimensions" is a physically objective and significantly more unified theory of physics and the extensive results make a good case for replacing the "Big Bang Theory" with the "Theory of Physics in 5 dimensions" as the model of the development of the universe.

Publications
 Zoom lenses Clark, Alan Dennis (1973). Zoom lenses – Monographs on Applied Optics No 7. Adam Hilger London. . 
 Mann, Allen (1993). Selected Papers on Zoom Lenses. SPIE. . (contains the above monograph in Section 8 : Monographs, pp. 521–567) 
  Clark, Alan Dennis (2011). Physics in 5 Dimensions - Bye, bye Big Bang. (Revised) 2017 edition winterwork  and is also available in PDF format *  for members of ResearchGate - the social networking site for scientists and researchers.

External links
 www.physics-in-5-dimensions.com, An Objective View of Physics, Physics in 5 Dimensions, Bye, bye Big Bang
 Alan Dennis Clark at ResearchGate - the social networking site for scientists and researchers
 Alan Dennis Clark at Google Citations - 68 citations(July 2021) Zoom lenses – Monograph on Applied Optics 1973

References

Living people
English physicists
1945 births
Scientists from London
Alumni of City, University of London
Alumni of Imperial College London
People educated at St Benedict's School, Ealing